Anna Montañana Gimeno (born October 24, 1980) is a former professional basketball player, representing Spain. She spent most of her career in Europe, and went to play in the WNBA for the Minnesota Lynx in 2009.

Club career 
Montañana was born in Alboraya, where she started playing basketball, and she went to play for nearby Dorna Godella, the most important Spanish team at the time. While playing for the cadettes and the junior teams, she made her debut in the top tier of the Spanish League  with the senior team one day before her 14th birthday. She played in several Spanish clubs from 1998 to 2001, when she moved to the United States to complete a college degree and play for the George Washington team.

She continued most of her career in Europe (Spain, Czech Republic, Turkey and France), playing also for the Minnesota Lynx in 2009. She retired in Perfumerías Avenida in 2015.

Coaching career 
On 8 February 2017, Montañana signed with Liga ACB team Baloncesto Fuenlabrada for being assistant coach, thus becoming the first woman to be part of the technical staff in the Spanish men's top league.

National team
She made her debut with Spain women's national basketball team at the age of 25. She played with the senior team for 7 years, from 2005 to 2012, getting 129 caps and 11.1 PPG. She participated in one Olympic tournament (Beijing 2008), two World Championships and three European Championships:

  1998 FIBA Europe Under-18 Championship for Women (youth)
 5th 2000 FIBA Europe Under-18 Championship for Women (youth)
  2005 Eurobasket
 8th 2006 World Championship
  2007 Eurobasket
 5th 2008 Summer Olympics
  2009 Eurobasket
  2010 World Championship

WNBA career statistics

Regular season

|-
| align="left" | 2009
| align="left" | Minnesota
| 16 || 1 || 10.6 || .389 || .333 || 1.000 || 1.6 || 1.2 || 0.6 || 0.0 || 0.8 || 2.2
|-
| align="left" | Career
| align="left" | 1 year, 1 team
| 16 || 1 || 10.6 || .389 || .333 || 1.000 || 1.6 || 1.2 || 0.6 || 0.0 || 0.8 || 2.2

George Washington statistics

Source

References

External links
WNBA stats

1980 births
Living people
Basketball players at the 2008 Summer Olympics
Minnesota Lynx players
Olympic basketball players of Spain
Spanish women's basketball players
George Washington Colonials women's basketball players
Undrafted Women's National Basketball Association players
Spanish basketball coaches
Forwards (basketball)